Magion may refer to:
 Magion 1, the first Czechoslovak satellite launched into orbit on October 24, 1978
 2696 Magion, a main-belt asteroid discovered on April 16, 1980
 Magion (band), a Dutch band